Michelle Brown (born 1969) is a British politician.

Michelle Brown may also refer to:

Michelle P. Brown, British manuscript curator and scholar
Michelle Brown, character in Identity Theft: The Michelle Brown Story

See also
Michele Brown (disambiguation)